Khalid Al-Bloushi may refer to:

 Khalid Al-Bloushi (footballer, born 1999), an Emirati footballer
 Khalid Abdulla Al Bloushi, an Emirati footballer